The 1984–85 Idaho Vandals men's basketball team represented the University of Idaho during the 1984–85 NCAA Division I men's basketball season. Members of the Big Sky Conference, the Vandals were led by second-year head coach Bill Trumbo and played their home games on campus at the Kibbie Dome in Moscow, Idaho.

At the conference tournament at Boise, the Vandals met league champion Nevada in the quarterfinal and lost by  The sole conference victory was a home blowout of Idaho State in early February in a rare Sunday afternoon game.

Idaho hosted and defeated Palouse neighbor Washington State by nineteen in early December, the fourth win over the Cougars in the last five meetings. Gonzaga edged the Vandals by two points in Spokane on January 2 for a second straight win in the series (following four consecutive losses).

The main basketball court of the Kibbie Dome was originally smooth tartan rubber (urethane), poured directly onto the pavement floor, resulting in a very hard and unforgiving surface, but also a tremendous home court advantage under head coach Don Monson in the early 1980s. After nine seasons, it was replaced in the fall of 1984 with a conventional hardwood floor, acquired from the University of Arizona in Tucson.

Postseason result

|-
!colspan=6 style=| Big Sky tournament

References

External links
Sports Reference – Idaho Vandals: 1984–85 basketball season
Gem of the Mountains: 1985 University of Idaho yearbook – 1984–85 basketball season
Idaho Argonaut – student newspaper – 1985 editions

Idaho Vandals men's basketball seasons
Idaho
Idaho
Idaho